Broken window may refer to:

Broken window fallacy, economic theory illustrating why destruction, and the money spent to recover from destruction, is not actually a net benefit to society
Broken windows theory, criminological theory of the norm-setting and signaling effect of urban disorder and vandalism on additional crime and anti-social behavior
"Broken Windows", 1982 magazine article by James Q. Wilson and George L. Kelling that originated the broken windows theory
Fixing Broken Windows, 1996 book by George L. Kelling and Catherine Coles that further popularized the broken windows theory
"Broken Window" (song), 2007 song by Arcade Fire
The Broken Window, 2008 crime thriller novel by Jeffery Deaver

See also 
Broken Windows, Empty Hallways, 1972 album by saxophonist Houston Person